MPs elected in the 1784 British general election

This is a list of the 558 MPs or Members of Parliament elected to the 314 constituencies of the Parliament of Great Britain in 1784, the 16th Parliament of Great Britain and their replacements returned at subsequent by-elections, arranged by constituency.



By-elections 
List of Great Britain by-elections (1774–90)

See also
1784 British general election
List of parliaments of Great Britain
Unreformed House of Commons

References

1784
British MPs 1784–1790
1784 in Great Britain
Lists of Members of the Parliament of Great Britain